The State Affairs Commission of the Democratic People's Republic of Korea (SAC) is defined by the 2016 constitution as "the supreme policy-oriented leadership body of State power."
The current president of the SAC, which is defined by the same constitution, is the head of state of the nation, the Supreme Leader of North Korea.

History
The National Defence Commission was created in 1972 as per the 1972 Constitution, originally the commission's mandate was to supervise national defense matters within North Korea.

Per the 4th plenary session of the Supreme People's Assembly in June 2016 the National Defence Commission was officially replaced by the State Affairs Commission, with an expanded focus towards other national concerns aside from defense and security.

Powers and responsibilities
Article 106 of the Constitution of North Korea defines the State Affairs Commission as the supreme state organ of policy direction of state sovereignty.  Article 109 of the Constitution states that the SAC's powers are to: 
deliberate and decide on major policies of the State including defence and security policies;
exercise supervision over the fulfillment of the orders of the President of the State Affairs Commission of the Democratic People's Republic of Korea and the decisions and directives of the Commission, and take measures for their fulfillment;
abrogate decisions and directives of State organs which run counter to the orders of the President of the SAC-DPRK and the decisions and directives of the Commission in its meetings.

In practice, SAC supervises the Cabinet of North Korea. It also directly supervises the three ministries that are not under the Cabinet, namely the Ministry of Defence, Ministry of State Security and the Ministry of Social Security as well as the Korean People's Army, mainly the General Staff Department of the Korean People's Army and General Political Bureau of the Korean People's Army. The Supreme Guard Command which is responsible for the top leadership and government protection is also under its command. One additional entity, the State Physical Culture and Sports Guidance Commission(국가체육지도위원회), is also under the SAC as its Chairman is appointed by the Commission.

Members
The following are the current members of the State Affairs Commission as of 29 September 2021:

List of members since 2016 
The following is the list of members of the State Affairs Commission since its first election on 29 June 2016. Names in bold indicates that they are a current member of the State Affairs Commission. Names are listed in their order of election.

References

Works cited

Politics of North Korea
Military of North Korea
State Affairs Commission
2016 establishments in North Korea